Piantadosi is a surname. Notable people with the surname include:

 Al Piantadosi (1882–1955), American composer of popular music
 Arthur Piantadosi (1916–1994), American sound engineer
 Sam Piantadosi (1946–2010), Australian union official and politician

See also
 Piantedosi, surname

Italian-language surnames